Victim mentality is an acquired personality trait in which a person tends to recognize or consider themselves a victim of the negative actions of others, and to behave as if this were the case in the face of contrary evidence of such circumstances. Victim mentality depends on clear thought processes and attribution. In some cases, those with a victim mentality have in fact been the victim of wrongdoing by others or have otherwise suffered misfortune through no fault of their own. However, such misfortune does not necessarily imply that one will respond by developing a pervasive and universal victim mentality where one frequently or constantly perceives oneself to be a victim.

The term is also used in reference to the tendency for blaming one's misfortunes on somebody else's misdeeds, which is also referred to as victimism.

Victim mentality is primarily developed, for example, from family members and situations during childhood. Similarly, criminals often engage in victim thinking, believing themselves to be moral and engaging in crime only as a reaction to an immoral world and furthermore feeling that authorities are unfairly singling them out for persecution.

Foundations 
In the most general sense, a victim is anyone who experiences injury, loss, or misfortune as a result of some event or series of events. This negative experience, however, is insufficient for the emergence of a sense of victimhood. Individuals may identify as a victim if they believe that:
 they were harmed;
 they were not the cause of the occurrence of the harmful act;
 they were under no obligation to prevent the harm;
 the harm constituted an injustice in that it violated their rights (if inflicted by a person), or they possessed qualities (e.g., strength or goodness of character) making them persons whom that harm did not befit;
 they deserve sympathy.
The desire for empathy is crucial in that the mere experience of a harmful event is not enough for the emergence of the sense of being a victim. In order to have this sense, there is the need to perceive the harm as undeserved, unjust and immoral, an act that could not be prevented by the victim. The need to obtain empathy and understanding can then emerge.

Individuals harboring a victim mentality would believe that:
 their lives are a series of challenges directly aimed at them;
 most aspects of life are negative and beyond their control;
 because of the challenges in their lives, they deserve sympathy;
 as they have little power to change things, little action should be taken to improve their problems. 
Victim mentality is often the product of violence. Those who have it usually had an experiences of crisis or trauma at its roots. In essence, it is a method of avoiding responsibility and criticism, receiving attention and compassion, and evading feelings of genuine anger.

Features

A victim mentality may manifest itself in a range of different behaviours or ways of thinking and talking:
 Identifying others as the cause for an undesired situation and denying a personal responsibility for one's own life or circumstances.
 Exhibiting heightened attention levels (hypervigilance) when in the presence of others. 
 Awareness of negative intentions of other people.
 Believing that other people are generally more fortunate.
 Gaining relief from feeling pity for oneself or receiving sympathy from others.

It has been typically characterized by attitudes of pessimism, self-pity, and repressed anger. People with victim mentality may develop convincing and sophisticated explanations in support of such ideas, which they then use to explain to themselves and others of their situation.

People with victim mentality may also be generally:
 exhibiting a general tendency to realistically perceive a situation; yet may lack an awareness or curiosity about the root of actual powerlessness in a situation
 introspective
 likely to display entitlement and selfishness.
 defensive: In conversation, reading a negative intention into a neutral question and reacting with a corresponding accusation, hindering the collective solution of problems by recognizing the inherent conflict.
 categorizing: tending to divide people into "good" and "bad" with no gray zone between them.
 unadventurous: generally unwilling to take even small and calculated risks; exaggerating the importance or likelihood of possible negative outcomes.
 exhibiting learned helplessness: underestimating one's ability or influence in a given situation; feeling powerless.
 self-abasing: Putting oneself down even further than others are doing.

A victim mentality may be reflected by linguistic markers or habits, such as pretending
 not to be able to do something ("I can't..."),
 not to have choices ("I must...", "I have no choice..."), or
 epistemological humility ("I don't know").

Other features of a victim mentality include:
 Need for recognition – the desire for individuals to have their victimhood recognized and affirmed by others. This recognition helps reaffirm positive basic assumptions held by the individual about themselves, others and the world in general. This also implies that offenders recognize their wrongdoing. At a collective level this can encourage people to have a positive well-being with regards to traumatic events and to encourage conciliatory attitudes in group conflicts.
 Moral elitism – the perception of the moral superiority of the self and the immorality of the other side, at both individual and group levels. At an individual level this tends to involve a "black and white" view of morality and the actions of individuals. The individual denies their own aggressiveness and sees the self as weak and persecuted by the morally impure, while the other person is seen as threatening, persecuting and immoral, preserving the image of a morally pure self. At a collective level, moral elitism means that groups emphasize the harm inflicted on them, while also seeing themselves as morally superior. This also means that individuals see their own violence as justified and moral, while the outgroup's violence is unjustified and morally wrong. 
 Lack of empathy – because individuals are concerned with their own suffering, they tend to be unwilling to divert interest to the suffering of others. They will either ignore the suffering others or act more selfishly. At the collective level, groups preoccupied with their own victimhood are unwilling to see the outgroup's perspective and show less empathy to their adversaries, while being less likely to accept responsibility for harms they commit. This results in the group being collectively egoistic.
 Rumination – victims tend to focus attention on their distress and its causes and consequences rather than solutions. This causes aggression in response to insults or threats and decreases a desire for forgiveness by including a desire for revenge against the perpetrator. Similar dynamics play out at the collective level.

Victims of abuse and manipulation

Victims of abuse and manipulation are often trapped in a self-image of victimization. The psychological profile of victimization includes a variety of feelings and emotions, such as pervasive sense of helplessness, passivity, loss of control, pessimism, negative thinking, strong feelings of guilt, shame, self-blame , and depression. This way of thinking can lead one to hopelessness and despair.  The victim role can be reinforced by individuals viewing themselves as having had the same agency at the time they were victimized as they have in the present.

It is common for a therapist to take a long period of time to build a trusting relationship with a victim. Oftentimes, victims will develop a distrust of authority figures, along with the expectation of being hurt or exploited.

Sexual abuse and victim mentality appear to have strong connections. Regardless of gender, all age groups forced to participate in and perform non-consensual sexual acts are more likely to develop feelings of self-recrimination, guilt, and self-blame for acts that they were forced to perform. Sexual abuse may also manifest in other ways such as petting, lewd verbal suggestions and communication, and exposure of one's body for sexual pleasure.

According to Koçtürk, Nilüfer et al. the timing of disclosure among victims of abuse may vary, especially when it comes to sexual abuse. If the event occurred during their childhood or teenage years, they may not tell anyone until adulthood. The reasons for doing so are numerous, such as not wanting to draw attention to the event, not wanting the event to become a public spectacle, fear that their peers, friends, and others would think negatively of them, and not wanting to cause problems within the household. It has been found that victims who disclose to their family members early on usually have higher levels of support from family members and their community. Encouragement to disclose their traumatic experience sooner, rather than later, is greatly needed.

Studies conducted by Andronnikova and Kudinov  sought to determine a correlation between the degree of abuse and victimhood, and the victim's likelihood to exhibit behaviors consistent with a victim mentality. Studies were successful in identifying a strong correlation between those with a victim mentality and negative behaviors such as catastrophizing, self-demandingness, demandingness to others, and low frustration tolerance.

Breaking out

In 2005, a study led by psychologist Charles R. Snyder indicated that if a victim mentality sufferer forgives themselves or the situation leading to that mental state, symptoms of PTSD or hostility can be mediated.

For adolescent victims, group support and psychodrama techniques can help people gain a realistic view of past traumas, seeing that they were helpless but are no longer so. These techniques emphasize the victims' feelings and expressing those feelings. Support groups are useful in allowing others to practice assertiveness techniques, and warmly supporting others in the process.

Successful techniques have included therapeutic teaching methods regarding concepts of normative decision theory, emotional intelligence, cognitive therapy, and psychological locus of control. These methods have proven helpful in allowing individuals with a victim mentality mindset to both recognize and release the mindset.

Trauma and victimhood 
Trauma can undermine an individual's assumptions about the world as a just and reasonable place and scientific studies have found that validation of trauma is important for therapeutic recovery. It is normal for victims to want perpetrators to take responsibility for their wrongdoing and studies conducted on patients and therapists indicate that they consider the validation of trauma and victimization as important for therapeutic recovery. De Lint and Marmo identify an 'antivictimism' mentality existing within society as a whole, and those who choose to use the label victim mentality; expecting individuals to only be "true victims" by showing fortitude and refusing to show pain, with displays of pain being seen as a sign of weakness. This will create an environment where a victim is expected to share their emotions, only to be judged for displaying them.

Victimology has studied the perceptions of victims from sociological and psychological perspectives. People who are victims of crime have a complicated relationship with the label of a victim, may feel that they are required to accept it to receive aid or for legal processes; they may feel accepting the label is necessary to avoid blame; they may want to reject it to avoid stigmatization, or give themselves a sense of agency; they may accept the label due to a desire for justice rather than sympathy. There can be a false dichotomy between the roles of victim and survivor, which either does not acknowledge the agency that victims exerted (for example, leaving their abusers) or the fact that others' behaviour caused them harm.

Politics 

Political psychologists Bar-Tal and Chernyak-Hai write that collective victim mentality develops from a progression of self-realization, social recognition, and eventual attempts to maintain victimhood status.

See also

 Blame
 DARVO
 Learned helplessness
 Mindset
 Moral agency
 Persecutory delusion
 Social justice warrior
 Victim blaming
 Victim complex
 Victim playing
 Victimisation

References

Bibliography
 Christopher Peterson (2006). A Primer in Positive Psychology. Oxford University Press.
 Thomas J. Nevitt: The Victim Mentality. https://web.archive.org/web/20121014034523/http://aaph.org/node/214

Abuse
Bullying
Personality traits
Victimology